Asia District could refer to:
 Asia District, Oklahoma City for the Chinatown district in Oklahoma City
 Asia District, Peru for the district in Cañete Province, Peru